Louise Giblin (born 1963) MA, MRBS, is a British body-cast sculptor. She is noted in particular for her "Body-Casting Olympians" project.

Training
Giblin trained under Antony Gormley and Peter Randall-Page at Brighton Polytechnic (1982–86) and at the Chelsea College of Arts (1989–93). From 1990 to 1994 she was on the Secondary Education Advisory Group within the Design Council, London. She was elected Associate of the Royal British Society of Sculptors in 2010 and was elected a full Member in 2014.

Awards
Giblin was selected as the visual artist to represent the UK at the G7 of Art, part of a larger G7 of Culture in Florence, Italy.

Olympians project

This project aimed to record the physiques of five British Olympians in 2011. Each subject body-cast also had a series of surface decorations pertinent to their lives. Part of the profits was donated to the Headfirst charity, which funds research into brain injuries. This project led Giblin to be called "one of the world's leading body cast sculptors".

The body-casts weigh around 10 kg and must be worn for an hour whilst setting.

The chosen subjects were:
Kriss Akabusi
Beth Tweddle
Dame Kelly Holmes 
Darren Leach
Sally Gunnell

Living Legends project
This work was produced for exhibition at Gallery Different in London November 2014. The exhibition private view was attended by Michael Portillo, Heather Mills, Duncan Goodhew and Reuben Richards.
Michael Portillo Head casting 2011 with a medieval Spanish town cast on the right cheek
Lord Colin Moynihan Head casting 2012
Heather Mills Body casting 2012
Duncan Goodhew Head casting 2014 (with water ripples)
Reuben Richards singer, three Head castings 2013
Daniel Whiston, figure skater, star of Dancing on Ice Body casting 2014

War veterans project
This is an exercise in "historical memory": casting the hands and body parts of British Military personnel who have served in the many wars post World War One. The subjects include the artist's brother, Brigadier John McIntosh, who served in Bosnia. The project is planned to be exhibited until November 2018, the centenary of the last day of World War One, having begun on the centenary of the start of the war.

1941 WWII Wellington Bomber Flt Sgt (later Sqn Ldr) Cornelius Turner 
1945–47 Palestine Sgt Noel Patrick 
1951–52 Korea Gunner Bill Park 
1970–93 Northern Ireland Maj Robbie Robertson 
1973–75 Cold War Norway OS Lawrence Kidman 
1976–77 Dhofar LCpl (later WO1) Julian Allerhead 
1982 Falkland Islands Operation Corporate Mne (later Maj) David Sippitt 
1985 Bosnia Operation Grapple (UN) Operation Resolute (NATO) Capt (later Maj) Michael Moran 
1990–91 Gulf War Operation Granby Trooper Glenn Fitzpatrick 
1993 Croatia Operation Hanwood Lt Col (later Maj Gen) Michael von Bertele
1994 Rwanda Operation Gabriel Combat Medic SSgt Nigel Partington 
1998 Bosnia Operation Palatine Maj (later Brig) John McIntosh 
1999 Kosovo Operation Agricola Capt (later Col) Patricia Gibson
2000 Sierra Leone  Operation Palliser Lt Col (later Brig) Kevin Beaton
2005 Afghanistan Operation Fingal Capt Hitmung Gurung 
2007 Iraq Operation Telic 10 LCoH P Smith 
2007 Iraq SAC (T) Jon-Allan Butterworth (Paralympian Cyclist London 2012, Rio 2017) 
2011 Libya CT (later Flt Sgt) John Kirk (Para Snow Sports Skier)

Other exhibitions

March 2011 RBA Mall Galleries, London
July 2011 Meta-Human, ROA Gallery, Pall Mall, London
July – September 2011 Art of Imagination, Pennsylvania Institute of Technology
Nov 2011 Edinburgh International Art Fair
February – March 2012 RBA Mall Galleries, London
March 2012 Glasgow Art Fair
June 2012 British Olympic Foundation Event, Frant (Lord Colin Moynihan's estate)
July 2012 Sculpture and Sport - A Celebration for 2012, The Octagon, Bath
March 2013 RBA Mall Galleries, London
March–July 2013 Beth Tweddle MBE sculpture at Museum of Liverpool
October 2013 Lords Cricket Ground, London
March 2014 RBA Mall Galleries, London
September 2015 Aberdeen Art Fair
September 2015 Manchester Art Fair
November 2015 Edinburgh International Art Fair
April 2016 Art Revolution Taipei, Taiwan
August – September 2016 Edinburgh Festival, Urbane Art Gallery
September – October 2016 Cambridge Art Fair
November 2016 Edinburgh International Art Fair
January 2017 London Art Fair
April 2017 Art Revolution Taipei, Taiwan
April 2017 Taekwon-Do European Championships, Liverpool

References

Sources

1963 births
British women sculptors
Living people
20th-century British sculptors
20th-century British women artists
21st-century British sculptors
21st-century British women artists
Alumni of the University of Brighton
Alumni of Chelsea College of Arts